Walupt Lake is a large freshwater lake located in the Gifford Pinchot National Forest in the Cascade Mountains of Washington. It is located near the town of Packwood and is popular for camping, boating, and hiking. The eastern half of the lake is within the Goat Rocks Wilderness. It is the deepest and second largest natural lake in Lewis County.

Hydrology
Walupt Lake is a ribbon lake situated near the end of a long glacial valley. The main inflow to Walupt Lake is the perennial, snowmelt-fed Walupt Creek, which flows out of a long valley into the east end of the lake. Other small streamlets flow into the lake from the steep valley walls above. The lake's watershed encompasses  of land in the southern Goat Rocks. Besides the lake itself, the watershed comprises forest and otherwise unproductive land.

Walupt Creek is also the lake's outflow, exiting the lake on its northwestern corner. The lake is somewhat boot-shaped with the toe pointed up the valley to the east.

Walupt Lake was created by an ancient landslide when the ridge on the northwest end slid down and created a natural dam.

History
Surveyor Albert Hale Sylvester first assigned the name Walupt to the lake.  The name is of Yakama origin, and Sylvester learned from Native Americans that Walupt was the Yakama name for the region.  According to legend, a great Yakama hunter pursued a mighty deer for many days, until finally the deer led him to the lake. The deer jumped in, swam around for a while, and then disappeared. Since then, any hunter whose chase leads to the lake will sometimes see the deer swimming in the lake.

Recreation
The eastern half of Walupt Lake is within the Goat Rocks Wilderness of the Gifford Pinchot National Forest. Walupt Lake Campground is a popular campground and day use area on the west end of the lake with 42 primitive sites and a boat ramp. The campground is also a popular access point for the Goat Rocks Wilderness. While very little of the surrounding countryside is visible from the lake, once on the ridges above the lake, a hiker can see the surrounding Goat Rocks, Mount Adams off to the south and Mount Rainier to the northwest. The Nannie Ridge Trail #98 and Walupt Lake Trail #101 both start at the eastern end of the campground and provide different views of the wilderness and surrounding area on the way to their respective junctions with the Pacific Crest National Scenic Trail.

References 

Lakes of Washington (state)
Lakes of Lewis County, Washington
Gifford Pinchot National Forest
Tourist attractions in Lewis County, Washington
Goat Rocks
Yakama